PR 100 is the name of different places:

In Puerto Rico 
Puerto Rico Highway 100, a secondary highway in southwestern Puerto Rico

In Spain 
PR-CV-100, a short-distance footpath of the Valencian Community

In the United States 
Texas Park Road 100, a highway that runs along South Padre Island